McKee Run (also known as McKee Creek) is a tributary of County Line Branch in Montour County, Pennsylvania, in the United States. The stream is designated as impaired by siltation and removal of vegetation due to agriculture. Land uses in the watershed include forested land, croplands, and pastures. A number of bridges cross the stream.

Course
McKee Run begins in a valley in Anthony Township. It flows south for several tenths of a mile before turning south-southwest for a short distance and leaving the valley. The stream then turns south again for about a mile before turning southwest for several tenths of a mile. It then turns south for several tenths of a mile and crosses Pennsylvania Route 44 and receiving an unnamed tributary from the left before turning southwest. A few tenths of a mile further downstream, it receives an unnamed tributary from the right and turns south-southeast. After several tenths of a mile, the stream reaches its confluence with County Line Branch.

Tributaries
McKee Run has no named tributaries. However, it does have two unnamed tributaries. These are known as UNT 18829 and UNT 18830.

Hydrology
All of these are impaired by siltation and removal of vegetation due to agriculture. However, the stream has good water quality.

Geography and geology

The roughness coefficient of the stream's channel at the Pennsylvania Route 44 bridge is 0.045.

The watershed of McKee Run contains rolling hills with croplands and pastures, as well as forested mountains. The stream does not experience streambank erosion near the Pennsylvania Route 44 bridge.

Watershed
A total of  drains into the stream upstream of the Pennsylvania Route 44 bridge. This part of the watershed is irregular in shape. The mouth of the stream is in the United States Geological Survey quadrangle of Washingtonville. However, its source is in the quadrangle of Hugesville. The watershed of the stream is in the northern part of Montour County.

The main land uses in the watershed of McKee Run above Pennsylvania Route 44 are forests, cropland, and pasture. A total of 6 percent of this part of the watershed is forested.

History
McKee Run was entered into the Geographic Names Information System on August 2, 1979. Its identifier in the Geographic Names Information System is 1180740. The stream is also known as McKee Creek.

A concrete bridge carrying State Route 1006 was constructed across McKee Run in 1913. A bridge carrying Pennsylvania Route 44 also crosses the stream.

The reservoir would have had a volume of  if built.

Biology
The vegetation along the streambanks of McKee Run consists of grasses in some reaches. Parts of the stream could benefit from additional riparian buffering.

See also
 Beaver Run (County Line Branch), next tributary of County Line Branch going upstream
 List of rivers of Pennsylvania

References

Rivers of Montour County, Pennsylvania
Tributaries of Chillisquaque Creek
Rivers of Pennsylvania